The 1956 Hong Kong riots, also known as the Double Ten riots, were the result of escalating provocations between the pro-Kuomintang and pro-CCP camps on Double Ten Day, 10 October 1956.

Most violence took place in the town of Tsuen Wan, five miles from central Kowloon. A mob stormed and ransacked a clinic and welfare centre, killing four civilians.

The protests spread to other parts of Kowloon including along Nathan Road. By 11 October, some of the mob began targeting foreigners. Protesters in Kowloon turned over a taxi carrying the Swiss Vice Consul Fritz Ernst and his wife on Nathan Road. The rioters doused the cab in gasoline and lit it on fire resulting in the death of the driver and Mrs. Ernst who succumbed to her injuries two days later.

To quell the riots, Colonial Secretary Edgeworth B. David ordered extra manpower from the British Forces Hong Kong, including armoured troops of  7th Hussars, to reinforce the Hong Kong Police Force in protecting civilians and dispersing the rioters.  In total, there were 59 deaths and approximately 500 injuries. Property damage was estimated at US$1,000,000.

See also

 1950s in Hong Kong
 1966 Hong Kong riots
 1967 Hong Kong riots
 1981 Hong Kong riots
 2014 Hong Kong protests

References

1956 riots
Riots
56 Riots
56 Riots
Looting
Hong Kong–Taiwan relations